T-complex protein 1 subunit delta is a protein that in humans is encoded by the CCT4 gene. The CCT4 protein is a component of the TRiC complex.

Interactions 

CCT4 has been shown to interact with PPP4C.

References

External links

Further reading